The 1987 Spanish regional elections were held on Wednesday, 10 June 1987, to elect the regional parliaments of thirteen of the seventeen autonomous communities—Aragon, Asturias, the Balearic Islands, the Canary Islands, Cantabria, Castile and León, Castilla–La Mancha, Extremadura, La Rioja, Madrid, Murcia, Navarre and the Valencian Community—, not including Andalusia, the Basque Country, Catalonia and Galicia, which had separate electoral cycles. 779 of 1,169 seats in the regional parliaments were up for election. The elections were held simultaneously with local elections all throughout Spain, as well as the 1987 European Parliament election.

The Spanish Socialist Workers' Party (PSOE) remained the largest party overall, as well as in most regional parliaments. However, it suffered from a drop in popular support which saw it losing many of the absolute majorities it had obtained four years previously. As a result, several centre-right coalitions and alliances were able to oust the Socialists from government in four out of the twelve regional administrations it had held previous to the election. The main national opposition party, the People's Alliance (AP), having suffered from an internal crisis and the breakup of the People's Coalition in 1986, also lost support compared to the previous election. Its former allies, the People's Democratic Party (PDP) and the Liberal Party (PL), stood separately in the regional elections but remained unable to capitalize on AP's losses.

Benefitting from the two main parties's fall was former Spanish Prime Minister Adolfo Suárez's Democratic and Social Centre (CDS), which became decisive for government formation in many regional assemblies. United Left (IU), a coalition made up by the Communist Party of Spain (PCE) and other minor left-wing groups, remained stagnant at the PCE's 1983 results.

Election date
Determination of election day varied depending on the autonomous community, with each one having competency to establish its own regulations. Typically, thirteen out of the seventeen autonomous communities—all but Andalusia, the Basque Country, Catalonia and Galicia—had their elections fixed to be held within sixty days from the day of expiry of the regional assemblies, together with nationwide local elections.

Regional governments
The following table lists party control in autonomous communities. Gains for a party are highlighted in that party's colour.

Opinion polls
Individual poll results are listed in the table below in reverse chronological order, showing the most recent first, and using the date the survey's fieldwork was done, as opposed to the date of publication. If such date is unknown, the date of publication is given instead. The highest percentage figure in each polling survey is displayed with its background shaded in the leading party's colour. In the instance of a tie, the figures with the highest percentages are shaded. in the case of seat projections, they are displayed in bold and in a different font.

Overall results

Summary by region

Aragon

Asturias

Balearics

Canary Islands

Cantabria

Castile and León

Castilla–La Mancha

Extremadura

La Rioja

Madrid

Murcia

Navarre

Valencian Community

References
Opinion poll sources

Other

External links
www.juntaelectoralcentral.es (in Spanish). Central Electoral Commission – Regional elections
www.argos.gva.es (in Spanish). Argos Information Portal – Electoral Historical Archive
www.historiaelectoral.com (in Spanish and Catalan). Electoral History – Regional elections since 1980

1987